Lianzhuang is a metro station on Line 4 of the Hangzhou Metro in China. It is located in the Binjiang District of Hangzhou.

References

Railway stations in Zhejiang
Railway stations in China opened in 2018
Hangzhou Metro stations